Marina Mikhailovna Dyuzheva (born October 9, 1955) is a Soviet and Russian film and stage actress.

Biography 

Marina Dyuzheva graduated in 1976 from the Russian Academy of Theatre Arts. She was an actress in both theater and film from 1978 to 1997.

She has had roles in more than fifty films. Early in her career she acted under her maiden name, Kukushkina. She met her first husband, Nicholas Dyuzhev, the son of an influential official at the Ministry of Culture, while studying at the Academy; however, this marriage quickly disintegrated.

In 1994, Marina Dyuzheva was invited to dub the French series Helen and the Boys, and she continued this kind of work in other foreign films. In the 1996 and 1997 seasons of the game show The Keys to Fort Boryard, she voiced the female host, Sandrine Dominguez.

Personal life 

 Married her first husband, Nicholay Dyuzhev, in 1975 and divorced in 1978
 Married her second husband, writer, journalist, radio host and driving instructor Yuri Geiko on February 4, 1983.
 Son Mikhail, born October 9, 1981
 Son Gregory, born August 28, 1986

Works

Filmography

Television Series 
 1988: Objective Circumstances — Irina Antipova

Cartoon Voices 

 2005: The Story of One Frog's Love

Documentary Films 

 2009: A Whole-Hearted Confession (documentary biopic dedicated to the work of Igor Starygin)

Theater Roles

Independent Theater Project 

 "Fierce Dance" (based on the novel They Shoot Horses, Don't They?) - Mary
 "Boing Boing" - M. Kamoletti — Berta
 "Calendar Girls" - T. Ferta — Ruth

Theatrical Production Center "Rusart" 

 "Five Nights" - Alexander Volodin - Zoe

Theatrical Marathon 

 "Dear Pamela" (based on the play by John Patrick) — Pamela Cronk

References 

 
 Марина Дюжева на сайте «Автоликбез»
 Д/ф Марина Дюжева: «Я вся такая внезапная, противоречивая» (Первый, 2015, к 55-летию актрисы)

Russian Academy of Theatre Arts alumni
1955 births
Living people
20th-century Russian actresses
21st-century Russian actresses
Soviet actresses
Russian film actresses
Russian television actresses
Russian stage actresses
Russian voice actresses